The 2002 Milton Keynes Council election took place on 2 May 2002 to elect members of Milton Keynes Unitary Council in Buckinghamshire, England. The whole council was up for election with boundary changes since the last election in 2000. The Liberal Democrats gained overall control of the council from no overall control.

Background
Before the election Labour had 22 seats, compared to 20 for the Liberal Democrats and 8 for the Conservatives. However the council was a top target for the Liberal Democrats in the 2002 local elections.

Election result

Ward results

References

2002 English local elections
2002
2000s in Buckinghamshire